Nico Young (born July 27, 2002) is an American distance runner competing as a sophomore for Northern Arizona University. He grew up in Camarillo, California and attended Newbury Park High School. He competed in the United States Olympics Trials in 2021.

Athletic career

High School Career 
Young ran for Newbury Park High School in Newbury Park, California. He broke the 3 mile cross country American high school record at the 2019 Woodbridge Invitational, running a time of 13:39.7, and lowered the American high school indoor 3000m record (previously held by Drew Hunter), running a time of 7:56.91. At the 2019 Nike Cross Nationals, Young won the race and set the course record with a time of 14:52 and led Newbury Park to the team victory. Young was named the 2019-20 XC National Gatorade Player of the Year and the 2019-20 Track and Field National Gatorade Player of the Year.  He was the first to sweep both awards in the same season.  His brother Leo picked up the California version of the Cross Country award in 2022.

Collegiate career 
During the 2020 cross country season, Young placed 4th place at the 2020 NCAA Division I Cross Country Championships with a time of 29:58.3 at the 10 km distance, the highest a true freshman has placed since 2001. He set an American junior record in the 5000m at the 2021 Drake Relays with a time of 13:24.26. With this time he qualified for the 2021 U.S. Olympic Trials, where he ran 13:35.94 and finished 9th.

Later that year, Young placed only 11th at the 2021 NCAA Division I Cross Country Championships with a time of 28:57.5, but he also would lower the American junior record in the indoor 5000m with a time of 13:22.59 at the BU Season Opener on December 4, 2021. The next year, Young placed 3rd in the 5000m and 7th in the 3000m at the 2022 NCAA Division I Indoor Track and Field Championships.

Young ran 13:11.30 at the Sound Running Track Meet in San Juan Capistrano, which is the fastest 5000m ever run by an American teenager and the 3rd fastest outdoor 5000m in collegiate history. He would end up placing 3rd in the 5000m at the 2022 NCAA Division I Outdoor Track and Field Championships. At the 2022 USA Outdoor Track and Field Championships, Young placed 8th in the 5000m, running a time of 13:19.15.

During the 2022 cross country season, Young would set an 10 km personal best of 28:01 at the NCAA Division I Mountain Region Cross Country Championships on November 11, 2022 before placing 2nd at the 2022 NCAA Division I Cross Country Championships with a time of 28:44.5. Two weeks later, Young lowered his indoor 5000m personal best to 13:15.25 at the BU Season Opener on December 3, 2022, finishing 5th in a field of collegiate and professional runners.

Personal Achievements

High School Personal Bests

College Personal Bests

References

External links
 
 
 Nico Young profile Milesplit.com
 Nico Young profile Northern Arizona Lumberjacks track and field
 Nico Young profile Northern Arizona Lumberjacks
 Nico Young profile TFRRS

2002 births
Living people
American male long-distance runners
People from Camarillo, California
Northern Arizona Lumberjacks men's track and field athletes
Northern Arizona Lumberjacks men's cross country runners
Track and field athletes from California
Gay sportsmen
American LGBT sportspeople